The following is a list of the 19 cantons of the Ardennes department, in France, following the French canton reorganisation which came into effect in March 2015:

 Attigny
 Bogny-sur-Meuse
 Carignan
 Charleville-Mézières-1
 Charleville-Mézières-2
 Charleville-Mézières-3
 Charleville-Mézières-4
 Château-Porcien
 Givet
 Nouvion-sur-Meuse
 Rethel
 Revin
 Rocroi
 Sedan-1
 Sedan-2
 Sedan-3
 Signy-l'Abbaye
 Villers-Semeuse
 Vouziers

References